9 Degrees West of the Moon is the 6th studio album by the Italian progressive power metal band Vision Divine. It was released in 2009. The album marks the return of the singer Fabio Lione after the departure of Michele Luppi.

Track listing

Credits
 Fabio Lione - Vocals
 Olaf Thörsen - Guitars
 Federico Puleri - Guitars
 Cristiano Bertocchi - Bass
 Alessio Lucatti - Keyboards, Piano
 Alessandro Bissa - Drums
 Barbara Garzoni - Violin, Viola
 Fausto Solci - Cello

References

2009 albums
Vision Divine albums
Frontiers Records albums